KWBY may refer to:

 KWBY (AM), a radio station (940 AM) licensed to serve Woodburn, Oregon, United States
 KWBY-FM, a radio station (98.5 FM) licensed to serve Ranger, Texas, United States